The Castle of Almansa is a castle located in Almansa, Spain. It was declared Bien de Interés Cultural in 1921.

References 

Castles in Castilla–La Mancha
Bien de Interés Cultural landmarks in the Province of Albacete
Almansa